This is a list of places in Thailand which have standing links to local communities in other countries. In most cases, the association, especially when formalised by local government, is known as "town twinning" (usually in Europe) or "sister cities" (usually in the rest of the world).

B
Bangkok

 Aichi Prefecture, Japan
 Ankara, Turkey
 Astana, Kazakhstan
 Beijing, China
 Chaozhou, China
 Chonqing, China
 Fukuoka Prefecture, Japan
 Guangzhou, China
 Hanoi, Vietnam
 Ho Chi Minh City, Vietnam
 Istanbul, Turkey
 Jakarta, Indonesia
 Lausanne, Switzerland
 Manila, Philippines
 Moscow, Russia

 Penang Island, Malaysia
 Phnom Penh, Cambodia
 Saint Petersburg, Russia
 Seoul, South Korea
 Shandong, China
 Shanghai, China
 Ulaanbaatar, Mongolia
 Washington, D.C., United States
 Wuhan, China

C
Chiang Rai
 Union City, United States

U
Udon Thani
 Reno, United States

References

Thailand
Sister cities in Thailand
Sister cities
Populated places in Thailand